The Ruth Stephens Gani Medal is awarded annually by the Australian Academy of Science to recognise research in human genetics.

The award honours the contributions by Ruth Stephens Gani to human cytogenetics.

It is an early career award normally for Australian resident nominees up to ten years work post doctorate.

Below are a list of recipients from 2008-2018 in the field:

Recipients
Source: Australian Academy of Science

See also

 List of genetics awards

References

Genetics awards
Australian Academy of Science Awards
Australian science and technology awards
Awards established in 2008